Thomas Coats (1809–1883), was a Scottish thread manufacturer.

Thomas Coats may also refer to:

Tommy Coats, actor in The Vigilantes Are Coming
Thomas Coats, 2nd Baron Glentanar, heir of George Coats, 1st Baron Glentanar

See also
Thomas Cotes (Royal Navy officer) (1712–1767), British admiral
Thomas Cotes (died 1641), London printer
Thomas Coates (disambiguation)
Thomas Glen-Coats (disambiguation)